Gaster may refer to:

 Stomach
 Gaster (insect anatomy)
 a trade name of famotidine, an inhibitor of stomach acid production 
 Gaster (district), a constituency in St. Gallen, Switzerland
 Gaster (surname)
 Gaster, a character in the television series PaRappa the Rapper